Filip Tasic (born 12 November 1998) is a Swedish footballer of Serbian ancestry who plays a midfielder.

Career

Youth career
Tasic started out his football career at local club Nackadala AIS. At the age of eight he moved to Djurgårdens IF. During his years at the academy Tasic had trials with Premier League clubs Arsenal and West Bromwich Albion. In January 2015 Tasic decided to reject the offer from West Bromwich Albion and to sign an U-21-contract with Djurgårdens IF.

Djurgårdens IF
Tasic made his debut in Allsvenskan for Djurgårdens IF in a 5–2 win against GIF Sundsvall on 6 November 2016 coming on as a sub in the last match of the season.
In 2017, he went on a loan to third-tier team Arameiska-Syrianska IF.

International career
Tasic has represented the Sweden national under-17 football team.

References

External links 
 Djurgården profile 

1998 births
Living people
Association football midfielders
Footballers from Stockholm
Swedish footballers
Sweden international footballers
Sweden youth international footballers
Allsvenskan players
Djurgårdens IF Fotboll players
Vasalunds IF players
Swedish expatriate footballers
Swedish people of Serbian descent